East Loch Tarbert is a sea loch that lies to the east of Harris in the Outer Hebrides of Scotland. The loch contains several small islands including Sgeotasaigh, Stiughiag, Stiughiag  na Leum and Rosaigh and the larger bridged island of Scalpay. The Caledonian MacBrayne ferry from the Isle of Skye to Harris reaches Tarbert via this loch.

The village of Tarbert lies on the small isthmus which separates East Loch Tarbert from West Loch Tarbert and joins North and South Harris.

Footnotes

Sea lochs of Scotland
Lochs of the Outer Hebrides
Harris, Outer Hebrides